Masatomo (written: , ,  or ) is a masculine Japanese given name. Notable people with the name include:

, Japanese footballer
, Japanese actor, voice actor and singer
, Japanese businessman
, Japanese basketball player

Japanese masculine given names